Hadassah, The Women's Zionist Organization of America is an American Jewish volunteer women's organization. Founded in 1912 by Henrietta Szold, it is one of the largest international Jewish organizations, with nearly 300,000 members in the United States. Hadassah fundraises for community programs and health initiatives in Israel, including the Hadassah Medical Organization, two leading research hospitals in Jerusalem. In the US, the organization advocates on behalf of women's rights, religious autonomy and US–Israel diplomacy. In Israel, Hadassah supports health education and research, women's initiatives, schools and programs for underprivileged youth.

History

Origins
At a meeting at Temple Emanu-El in New York City on February 24, 1912, Henrietta Szold together with other Zionist women, proposed to the Daughters of Zion study circle that they expand their purpose and embrace proactive work to help meet the health needs of Palestine's people. The goal was to promote the Zionist ideal through education, public health initiatives, and the training of nurses in what was then the Palestine region of the Ottoman Empire. Because the meeting was held around the time of Purim, the women called themselves "The Hadassah chapter of the Daughters of Zion," adopting the Hebrew name of Queen Esther. Henrietta Szold became the first president. Within a year, Hadassah had five growing chapters in New York, Baltimore, Cleveland, Chicago and Boston. Its charter articulates twin goals: to begin public-health initiatives and nurses training in Palestine, and to foster Zionist ideals through education in America.

The first years: Establishing healthcare in Palestine
In 1913, Hadassah sent two nurses to Palestine, Rose Kaplan and Rae Landy. They set up a small public health station in Jerusalem to provide maternity care and treat trachoma, a dreaded eye disease rampant in the Middle East. The core of future Hadassah education programs emerged when Jessie Sampter founded The Hadassah School of Zionism in New York in 1915. The school required chapter leaders to take courses, instituted a correspondence course and inspires other Hadassah chapters to create their own Schools of Zionism. Sampter published "A Course in Zionism," a collection of facts, essays, and reading lists financed by prominent American Zionist, Judge Louis Brandeis.

By 1916, Hadassah established the Palestine Purchasing and Supplies Department (later the Hadassah Supplies Bureau) to buy and ship items unavailable in the yishuv, the pre-state Jewish community in Palestine. Although Hadassah's first two nurses were compelled to return to America in 1915, the physicians with whom they had co-operated– Dr. Avraham Ticho and Dr. Helena Kagan – as well as the midwives and probationers were able to carry on their work.

Hadassah established the American Zionist Medical Unit (AZMU) in 1918, which was composed of 45 doctors, nurses, dentists and sanitary engineers. The Unit was set up to combat the intolerable health conditions of postwar Palestine and to create permanent health and welfare programs. From the beginning, it established a principle that it would serve all with equal care, regardless of race, creed, ethnicity or nationality. The AZMU helped to establish six hospitals in Palestine which were then turned over to municipal authorities. Led by Alice Seligsberg, the Unit sailed for Palestine in June, bringing desperately needed drugs, medical instruments and supplies, linen and clothing. That year, Hadassah also founded a nursing school to train local personnel and create a cadre of nurses. Over the next few years, the Unit, based in the old Rothschild Hospital in Jerusalem, initiated American-style health and welfare programs with intensive campaigns to wipe out malaria, cholera, trachoma and scalp diseases in many Jewish communities in the yishuv. The Unit organized a sanitation program and founded Hadassah hospitals in Jaffa, Tiberias, and Safed, as well as opened the Nurses Training School at the Rothschild Hospital in Jerusalem. The first 22 young women graduated from Hadassah's Nurses' Training School in 1921. In 1924, the Unit's name is changed to Hadassah Medical Organization.

In 1919, Hadassah organized the first School Hygiene Department in Palestine to give routine health examinations to Jerusalem school children. During the Arab riots of 1920, Hadassah nurses cared for the wounded on both sides. Henrietta Szold also moved to Jerusalem that year to develop community health and preventive care programs. Back in New York in 1920, Alice Seligsberg formed Junior Hadassah, which provided innovative programs for young women who wanted to participate in Hadassah's Zionist mission. In the same year, Henrietta Szold moved to Palestine to lead the medical work started by the Unit. She remained based in Jerusalem until her death in 1945.

In 1921, Hadassah nurse Bertha Landsman created Palestine's first permanent infant welfare station, Tipat Halav (Drop of Milk), in Jerusalem. The overwhelming success inspired Hadassah to expand the program, delivering fresh milk to needy families by "donkey express." Hadassah also opened a hospital in Tel Aviv, the city's first hospital. Under Hadassah's philosophy of "devolution," it initiated and developed a number of facilities and projects and then transferred them to the appropriate municipalities. Hadassah transferred administration of this hospital to the Tel Aviv municipality in 1931.

1923: Hadassah instituted a school lunch program to teach nutrition and serve healthy meals to children and teenagers in Palestine. Pennies are collected by American Hebrew school students to fund this project, which is devolved to the Israeli government in 1950, with Hadassah's support ending in 1954.

1924: Nathan Straus contributed $10,000 with which Hadassah develops its Infant Welfare Stations into a complete network, extending from Jerusalem to Tiberias. Pamphlets were distributed to all Hadassah chapters for five cents each.

1925: Junior Hadassah assumed sole support of the Meir Shfeyah Children's Village, a youth village housing World War I orphans and socially disadvantaged children (devolved to the Israel Ministry of Agriculture in 1953, with Hadassah continuing limited financial support).

1926: Hadassah forms a partnership with the Jewish National Fund (JNF), also known as Keren Keyemeth LeYisrael (KKL), an organization established in 1901 by the Fifth World Zionist Congress to purchase and transform land in Palestine for Jewish farming, housing, roads, and recreation. JNF became, and has remained, a major Hadassah project in Israel. Hadassah opens Palestine's first tuberculosis ward in its Safed hospital, which becomes the region's tuberculosis center in 1935 (devolved to the Israeli government in 1957).

1927: The cornerstone is laid at a solemn ceremony for the Nathan and Lina Straus Health Center in Jerusalem, conceived as a model for future health centers in Palestine, with funding from Nathan Straus. According to Dr. E. M. Bluestone, then Director of the Hadassah Medical Organization, this center would serve as the headquarters of the Health Welfare Department of the Hadassah Medical Organization, with space devoted to new health activities. Through the decades many preventive health programs were housed in this building - a dental clinic, children's exercise programs, and Nathan Straus' milk pasteurization plant among others.

1928: Hadassah's urban recreational activities program begins with the supervision of the Guggenheimer Playgrounds, with funds from the estate of Bertha V. Guggenheimer. By 1950, when the playgrounds were devolved to the Israel Government's Department of Education, the program had grown to fifty playgrounds throughout the country where urban children had a safe, sanitary place to play.

1929: Hadassah Medical Organization (HMO) opens the Nathan and Lina Straus Health Center to serve Jerusalem's growing population, made possible by a large gift from the Straus family. (Operates today as an outpatient facility in downtown Jerusalem)

Youth Aliyah
1933: Recha Freier begins Youth Aliyah (Jugendaliyah, Aliyat Hano'ar) in Berlin, working with German youth leaders to resettle Jewish children in Palestine. Henrietta Szold is appointed the first Director of Youth Aliyah by the governing council of the Yishuv, the Va'ad Le'umi.

1934: Youth Aliyah's first 43 wards arrive in Haifa. In what becomes a lifelong practice, Henrietta Szold greets them at the dock and accompanies them to Kibbutz Ein Harod. The cornerstone is laid on Mount Scopus for the Rothschild-Hadassah University Hospital (RHUH) and new quarters for Hadassah's Nurses' Training School.

1935: Spearheaded by National President Rose Jacobs, Convention delegates accept Youth Aliyah as an official Hadassah project and establish Hadassah as its sole American sponsor. Palestine's first social-service programs begin when Hadassah opens the Nettie Lasker Social Service Department in Jerusalem.

1936: In honor of Henrietta Szold's 75th birthday, the name of the nursing school is officially changed during graduation ceremonies to the Henrietta Szold Hadassah-Hebrew University School of Nursing. October 21 is the Groundbreaking ceremony for the Hadassah-Hebrew University Hospital and Medical School on Mt. Scopus, attended by Henrietta Szold, David Ben-Gurion, hospital architect Erich Mendelsohn and others Young Judaea, the oldest Zionist youth movement in the U.S. (founded 1909), joins the Hadassah family when Hadassah agrees to provide partial funding for the movement. The British Royal Commission, known as the Peel Commission, praised the work of Hadassah in its 1937 report:The Hadassah Medical Organization has developed a widespread system of clinics in Jewish centres and hospitals in the principal towns...Though naturally the Jewish population benefited most, the Hadassah medical services were available to all the communities in Palestine and many of the poorer classes amongst the Arabs received much assistance from the work of the organization. This disinterested philanthropy of Hadassah deserves recognition: it was a real step towards the promotion of good feeling between the two races; but unhappily the effect of its work was impaired by other influences.1939: The Rothschild-Hadassah University Hospital on Mount Scopus, the first teaching hospital and medical center in Palestine, opens on May 9. New Scopus quarters for the celebrated Henrietta Szold-Hadassah School of Nursing are also dedicated. When World War II begins in Europe on September 1, Hadassah begins war emergency shipments of medical supplies, equipment, food, drugs and clothing to Palestine. Hadassah began the Palestine Supplies Bureau in the 1920s.

Advocacy in the U.S.
1940: Hadassah and the Zionist Organization of America (ZOA) form the American Zionist Youth Commission, establishing Hadassah as Young Judaea's co-sponsor. Hadassah forms an American Affairs Committee, the core of today's American Affairs programs, reflecting Hadassah's concern with the ideals of democracy, freedom and justice in the U.S. and in the yishuv. War relief and defense of democracy are two immediate committee projects. Former Hadassah national president Rose Jacobs starts the Committee for the Study of Arab-Jewish Relations to promote "Zionism's unfinished agenda," co-existence between Palestine's two major populations.

1941–1970: Building healthcare in Israel 

1941: Hadassah sends an American neurosurgeon, Dr. Henry Wigderson, to Palestine to create the Hadassah Medical Organization's first Department of Neurosurgery. At age 81, Henrietta Szold establishes the Child and Youth Welfare Organization to coordinate the activities of public and voluntary child and youth welfare services. Hadassah, the Va'ad Leumi and the Jewish Agency fund the project. In 1945, after her death, the organization is renamed the Henrietta Szold Foundation for Child and Youth Welfare. In 1948 it becomes autonomous, with Hadassah participating on the board of directors. In 1960, on the centennial of Szold's birth, the Israeli government, together with Hadassah and the Jewish Agency, undertake to contribute to the budget of the foundation, now renamed Machon (or Mosad) Szold, the Szold Institute.

Hadassah women in WWII
1942: After the U.S. enters World War II, Hadassah immediately mobilizes to support the American war effort. Members establish blood banks, sell war bonds, volunteer in their local communities, while National Hadassah continues to ship food, drugs and medical supplies to Palestine. At the behest of Henrietta Szold, Hadassah begins its vocational education initiatives, later called the Hadassah Vocational Education Services (HVES), by establishing the Alice L. Seligsberg Trade School for Girls, the first school of its kind in Palestine; 35 girls enroll.

1943: Due in part to Hadassah's relentless efforts, the Teheran Children, a group of more than 800 young Polish Jewish refugees, arrive in Haifa, after four years of wandering from Poland through the Soviet Union to a squalid refugee camp outside Teheran. Youth Aliyah accepts these young Holocaust survivors and helps them adjust to their new lives.

1944: Hadassah opens the Apprenticeship Department at the Brandeis Vocational Center, named in honor of Supreme Court Justice Louis D. Brandeis. The Fine Mechanics Workshop is joined two years later by the Apprenticeship School of Printing. Opening of the Hadassah Vocational Guidance Bureau in Jerusalem (later, the Hadassah Vocational Guidance Institute, renamed Hadassah Career Counseling Institute [HCCI] in 1989). Youth Aliyah observes its tenth year of youth rescue.

1945: Henrietta Szold, age 84, dies of pneumonia on February 13 (30 Shevat 5705) at the Rothschild-Hadassah University Hospital. Her funeral is attended by some of the thousands of Youth Aliyah children and nursing students whose lives she touched. She is mourned throughout the world. Hadassah and the American Friends of Hebrew University initiate a $4 million fundraising campaign to build the Hebrew University-Hadassah School of Medicine.

Hadassah is awarded a citation recognizing the sale of $200 million worth of U.S. government defense bonds during World War II.

Impact of UN Partition Plan
1947: In the wake of the UN partition plan of November 29, which calls for the establishment of independent Jewish and Arab enclaves in Palestine within a year, travel to and from Mount Scopus becomes increasingly dangerous. Hadassah and Hebrew University personnel are compelled to commute by armed convoy. Part of the process in making their decision involved a visit by members of the United Nations Special Committee on Palestine (UNSCOP) to various facilities throughout Palestine, including the sophisticated Rothschild-Hadassah University Hospital on Mount Scopus.

Hadassah Medical Convoy Massacre

1948: While attempting to reach Mount Scopus on April 13, a convoy of Hadassah and Hebrew University doctors, nurses and other personnel are ambushed. Besieged and under fire for hours, in the end 78 people are killed, among them HMO Director Dr. Haim Yassky. Unable to guarantee the safety of its patients or staff, Hadassah evacuates all its facilities on Mount Scopus, relocating all departments to five makeshift hospitals in temporary quarters around Jerusalem. Hadassah's access to Mount Scopus is lost for the next 19 years.

Israel's birth
1948: The State of Israel is born. HMO tends the thousands of wounded soldiers pouring into Jerusalem, plus the usual high numbers of civilians seeking aid.

1949: As "Operation Magic Carpet" rescues and brings 45,000 Yemenite Jews to Israel, HMO creates an emergency hospital in Rosh Ha'ayin for the care of new immigrants, as requested by the new Israeli government. With their resources stretched to the limit, the Hadassah Medical Organization in Jerusalem asks the Hadassah National Board to provide six American nurses who would work for a year at the Rosh Ha'ayin immigrant camp. Youth Aliyah opens Ramat Hadassah Szold Youth Village near Haifa as a reception center and to receive refugee children from Arab countries, Turkey, Hungary and elsewhere. Today it serves Israeli-born and immigrant children, ages 11 to 15, who require intensive remedial education programs. Hadassah establishes the Henrietta Szold Award as its highest honor, to be presented annually. Eleanor Roosevelt is named the first honoree for her efforts on Hadassah's behalf, most notably as World Patron of Youth Aliyah. HMO opens the Lasker Mental Hygiene and Child Guidance Clinic in Jerusalem (today part of HMO's Department of Psychiatry). Hadassah opens the Hadassah-Yassky Memorial Hospital in Beersheva (devolved to Kupat Holim in 1960).

1950: Two years after the evacuation of Mount Scopus, the Hadassah National Board votes to build a new, state-of-the-art medical center on the hillside above Ein Kerem, a small village west of Jerusalem. A fundraising campaign for this medical complex begins in 1953. As part of its continuing policy of devolution, Hadassah transfers its Nutrition Department, including the school lunch program, to the Israeli government.

New medical center
1952: Hadassah transfers its network of 134 health welfare stations throughout Israel to the Israeli government, retaining its 32 stations in Jerusalem and surroundings, which it devolves to the government in 1963. The Hebrew University-Hadassah School of Medicine graduates its first class of physicians. The groundbreaking is held for the new medical center at Ein Kerem. Hadassah's educational youth programs in Israel, previously grouped under Hadassah Youth Services, changes name to Hadassah Vocational Education Services.

Operation Reindeer
1953: Hadassah participates in "Operation Reindeer," a U.S. government program to alleviate food shortages within Israel, particularly within immigrant populations. The Hebrew University-Hadassah School of Dental Medicine, founded in cooperation with the Alpha-Omega Dental Fraternity, opens. Students train at HMO's Jerusalem dental clinic.

1954: HMO pilots Ya'al, the "Helping Hand of Hadassah," a volunteer auxiliary of women who serve in Hadassah's medical facilities. This innovative Israeli "first" becomes a model for volunteerism in Israel. HMO opens Israel's first cardiac surgical unit and its first Department of Psychiatry at the Hebrew University-Hadassah School of Medicine.

1955: Youth Aliyah begins its day center program with services for youth from Israel's rural and development areas. The program rapidly expands to encompass urban youth as well. The national headquarters of HWZOA moves into its first "house," a Hadassah owned and occupied building on East 52nd Street in New York City.

1956: HMO pilots a community health station in the Arab village of Abu Ghosh. Young Judaea opens its first Year Course in Israel for high school graduates.

1958: Construction of the new medical center at Ein Kerem accelerates. First Hadassah pilgrimage to Israel.

1959: HMO introduces open-heart surgery to Israel, installs the cobalt bomb for cancer therapy and graduates the first ten Israel-trained dentists from the Hebrew University-Hadassah School of Dental Medicine. As part of Israel's ongoing commitment to aid developing nations, the Hebrew University-Hadassah School of Medicine begins training African and Asian doctors in cooperation with the World Health Organization and Israel's Foreign Ministry. The initiative later expands to include South American doctors.

1961: Hadassah-Ein Kerem opens on June 6 with a joyous moving day. Supervised by HMO senior staff, the Israeli Army meticulously and efficiently transports every patient in each of Hadassah's five temporary hospitals to a preassigned bed at the new medical center.

1962: Hadassah turns 50 and celebrates its golden jubilee year. The Fannie and Maxwell Abbell Chapel (synagogue) at Hadassah-Ein Kerem is dedicated. Marc Chagall's magnificent 12 stained glass windows, each representing one of Israel's 12 tribes, grace the synagogue. Former National President Dr. Miriam Freund-Rosenthal is responsible for enlisting the noted artist and seeing the project to completion.

1964: The Hebrew University-Hadassah School of Dental Medicine moves into its new quarters at Hadassah-Ein Kerem. Chaim Gross' bronze "Mother and Child" sculpture is installed near the entrance to Hadassah-Ein Kerem.

1965: The U.S. Agency for International Development (AID) announces its first grant to Hadassah: $335,000 for Hadassah-Ein Kerem and the Alice L. Seligsberg High School. Today Hadassah continues to receive generous AID grants earmarked for HMO. The Hebrew University-Hadassah School of Medicine moves to new building facilities at Hadassah-Ein Kerem.

Israel's first open heart surgery
1967: An HMO surgical team completes Israel's first successful two-valve open-heart operation. Hadassah Associates is founded as the fundraising arm for American men who want to provide support for Hadassah's work. Rebecca Shulman, the only National Board member in Israel during the Six-Day War, is given a seat in the first Hadassah Medical Organization car to travel to the hospital on Mount Scopus immediately after the war ends. For the first time since 1948, the Hadassah flag was raised at the damaged hospital buildings. At the end of the Six-Day War, National President Charlotte Jacobson and HMO Director-General Dr. Kalman Mann travel to Mount Scopus to receive the keys to Hadassah's hospital. At the request of the Israeli government, Hadassah agrees to rebuild its first "hill of healing" as a state-of-the-art general hospital for the surrounding community. Hadassah accepts sole sponsorship of an expanded, co-educational Zionist Youth Movement. Young Judaea and Junior Hadassah are merged as Hashachar (the Dawn) for ages 9–18. Young adults, ages 18–25, become members of Hamagshimim (the Fulfillers). The movement as a whole is referred to as "Young Judaea."

Israel's first kidney transplant
1967: HMO performs Israel's first successful kidney transplant.

1968: The official restoration of Hadassah-Mount Scopus begins when Hadassah plans a 260-bed hospital for the entire community and agrees to build a state-of-the-art rehabilitation center within. Fundraising Campaign for the restoration of Hadassah-Mount Scopus. HMO pioneers 24-hour emergency units at Hadassah-Ein Kerem for acute respiratory and coronary care, burns and trauma. At the first National Board Mid-Winter meetings held in Israel, ground is broken at Hadassah-Ein Kerem for the Siegfried & Irma Ullman Building for Cancer and Allied Diseases, which will house the Moshe Sharett Institute of Oncology (opens 1976).

1970: Hadassah establishes a youth center on Mount Scopus, for Young Judaeans participating in Israel programs, in the building that was intended for the Nurses' Training School before 1948. The building, where Henrietta Szold lived during her final illness, the first on Mount Scopus to be renovated, is renamed the Judith Riklis Building (Beit Riklis).Hadassah establishes the Hebrew University-Hadassah School of Occupational Therapy, housed in the Edith and James Ross building on Hadassah-Mount Scopus. The Hadassah Community College, Israel's first American-style community college, opens in the Brandeis Vocational Center complex with 124 day and 84 evening students (renamed Hadassah College Jerusalem [HCJ] in 2006). The Alice Seligsberg Comprehensive High School merges with Brandeis (see 1944) to become the co-ed Hadassah Seligsberg-Brandeis Comprehensive High School (devolved to the Jerusalem municipality in 1988).

Postwar
1972: The Hadassah Community College graduates its first class with Golda Meir as guest of honor. Hadassah incorporates the high school, the college and the guidance center under one project, named Hadassah Israel Education Services (HIES).

1973: Graduates of the Young Judaea Year Course in Israel lead a group of olim ("new immigrants") and native-born Israelis and establish Kibbutz Ketura in the Arava region of the Negev. HMO medical teams rapidly mobilize, treating more than 4,000 casualties during the Yom Kippur War. During and after the war, HMO concentrates on the rehabilitation of the severely burned and wounded, relying heavily on pace-setting rehabilitation services offered through its newly opened Trauma Unit.

1974: After Congress passes legislation, which helps tens of thousands of Soviet Jews to immigrate to Israel during the 1970s and '80s, the National Board allocates $1 million to retrain Russian doctors, nurses and other health professionals at HMO. In honor of Youth Aliyah's 40th anniversary, Hadassah allocates more than $1 million to provide new residential and innovative day centers for Youth Aliyah.

UN General Assembly Resolution 3379: "Zionism Equals Racism"
1975: On October 21 Hadassah rededicates the rebuilt and refurbished Hadassah University Hospital at Mount Scopus. The Arab bloc succeeds in passing United Nations General Assembly Resolution 3379 "Elimination of All Forms of Racial Discrimination", better known as the "Zionism Equals Racism" resolution. Hadassah works passionately for its repeal, and it is ultimately rescinded in 1991. Hadassah introduces the Bachelor of Nursing Sciences program at the Henrietta Szold Hadassah-Hebrew University School of Nursing, Israel's first four-year degree program in nursing. Hadassah pledges to help Youth Aliyah absorb 3,000 disadvantaged Israeli youth and allocates $200,000 to build new dormitory space, its first program to focus exclusively on native-born Israelis. This program continues today as Youth Aliyah's Children at Risk.

1976: Hadassah welcomes its 100,000th Life Member. The newly reopened Hadassah-Mount Scopus hospital receives its first 100 patients in April, almost 28 years after the convoy massacre of 1948. Hadassah and JNF celebrate 50 years of partnership by completing Hadassah's 16th JNF project, "Greening of the Desert," in three development towns, and by dedicating Hadassah Plaza in the JNF Bicentennial Park near Jerusalem. The Daniel and Florence Guggenheim Rehabilitation Pavilion, the first of its kind in Israel, opens at Hadassah-Mount Scopus. The Moshe Sharett Institute of Oncology and Allied Diseases opens in the Siegfried and Irma Ullmann Building at Hadassah-Ein Kerem. Hadassah moves its national headquarters from West 52nd Street to 50 West 58th Street, New York, its current location.

Israel's first EMI scanner
1977: Hadassah installs Israel's first EMI scanner at HMO's Radiology Department and opens the Rosalie Goldberg Neonatal Intensive Care Unit, Israel's first NICU, at Hadassah-Mt. Scopus. The NICU soon receives its first one-pound baby. The Aleen and Lawrence Schacht-Hadassah Day Care Nursery opens at Hadassah-Ein Kerem to care for 100 preschool-age children of hospital personnel.

1978:Hadassah Community College opens Israel's first two-year dental technicians' course, in cooperation with the faculty of the Hebrew University-Hadassah School of Dental Medicine. HMO performs Israel's first successful bone marrow transplant. In the euphoria following the previous year's visit of Egyptian President Anwar el-Sadat to Jerusalem, Hadassah convenes its 64th National Convention—its first in Israel— bringing 2,500 participants to Jerusalem. Hadassah establishes a tradition of holding periodic National Conventions in Israel. Jacques Lipchitz's sculpture, "Tree of Life", is unveiled at Hadassah Mount Scopus.

1979: Hadassah's Aliyah Department, organizes Israel Family Live-In programs for work-study-travel participants. National and local Hadassah leaders march for Soviet Jewry in the Solidarity Sunday parade in New York.

1982: HMO receives casualties by helicopter and ambulance convoy throughout the first war with Lebanon. Despite the war, Hadassah holds its 68th National Convention in Israel, the organization's second Israel convention. Hadassah-Ein Kerem becomes one of five world centers capable of performing test-tube conception. A year later, Jerusalem's first test-tube baby (a girl) is born there to a "high risk" mother.

1984: HMO receives casualties by helicopter and ambulance convoy throughout the first war with Lebanon. Despite the war, Hadassah holds its 68th National Convention in Israel, the organization's second Israel convention. Hadassah-Ein Kerem becomes one of five world centers capable of performing test-tube conception. A year later, Jerusalem's first test-tube baby (a girl) is born there to a "high risk" mother.

1986: The Ina and Jack Kay Hospice, Jerusalem's only Jewish hospice, opens at Hadassah-Mount Scopus, in response to a critical need by Jewish patients. HMO opens a regional AIDS testing center at Hadassah-Ein Kerem.

Building hospitals in Africa
1988: At the invitation of U.S. AID, HMO medical staff members help plan, construct and open a hospital in Kinshasa, Zaire. Hadassah advocates for increased health services for those infected with HIV/AIDS and adequate funding for AIDS research in the U.S. The Hadassah Seligsberg-Brandeis Comprehensive High School is devolved to the Jerusalem municipality and relocates to East Talpiot. Expansion of Hadassah Community College begins.

Marching for reproductive rights in the U.S. 
1989: At a historic pro-choice rally of 300,000 in Washington, DC, Hadassah marches with women and men from across the U.S. With the end of the Cold War and the gradual collapse of the Soviet bloc, hundreds of thousands of Soviet Jews begin to leave for Israel; Hadassah prepares to meet their needs and to absorb many of them as employees. HIES is restructured: Hadassah Community College is renamed the Hadassah College of Technology (HCT), today Israel's foremost technology institute (now called Hadassah College-Jerusalem). The Hadassah Vocational Guidance Bureau is renamed Hadassah Career Counseling Institute (HCCI). The city of Jerusalem honors Hadassah by dedicating Hadassah Square, a small city square on Rehov Ha-Melekh George (King George Street), near Agron Street. HMO's Complementary (alternative) Medicine Department opens in downtown Jerusalem (moves to Hadassah-Ein Kerem in 2001).

Operation Exodus 
1990: As "Operation Exodus" brings waves of Jews to Israel from the dissolving Soviet Union, Hadassah takes part in these ways: 
1. HMO begins to absorb and retrain groups of health- care professionals. 
2. HCT becomes the first institution in Israel to retrain the immigrants by using both Russian and Hebrew courses in dental and laboratory technology, and translating its materials into Russian. HCCI trains Russian career counselors and offers Russian-language occupational materials to immigrants. 
3. Youth Aliyah starts its first ulpan (Hebrew language program) for Soviet students. 4. Young Judaea invites Soviet teen immigrants living in the U.S. to attend its leadership camp, Tel Yehudah. Hadassah meets an additional JNF pledge to replace 100,000 trees destroyed by arson, and pledges to provide JNF recreational facilities in a Galilee development plan. Within one two-week period in a remote area of Kenya, HMO eye surgeons operate on 400 blind people, giving sight to many for the first time.

1992: During the Persian Gulf War ("Operation Desert Storm," 1991), Iraqi Scud missiles assault Israel. HMO treats casualties and helps distribute health information and gas masks to the population. Despite the risks, 45 National Board members, led by National President Carmela E. Kalmanson, travel to Israel on their scheduled mission, demonstrating Hadassah's solidarity with Israel's besieged people. "Operation Solomon" brings thousands of Ethiopian Jews to Israel; 14,500 arrive within a single day. Hadassah contributes $3 million to Youth Aliyah over three years, enabling it to adapt its programs to meet the needs of this newest group of olim. HMO formally opens two major interdisciplinary units for liver disease and diabetes, both with state-of-the-art inpatient wards, outpatient clinics, laboratories, and facilities for day care, patient education, teaching and research. Kiryat HaYovel opens a special clinic to extend care to 700 Ethiopian immigrants. Hadassah initiates Hadassah Cares, an ongoing breast health awareness and education program for American women of all ages. This program includes Hadassah's award-winning Check It Out program for high-school girls, and today offers testicular cancer education for teenage boys.

Israel's first heart-lung transplant 
1993: HMO performs Israel's first successful heart-lung transplant.

1994: Hadassah, WZOA, receives the approval of the Zionist General Council for special status as a member of the World Zionist Organization, ensuring that Hadassah will be granted participation in all activities of the World Zionist Organization, as well as in every Congress, with a fixed delegation of 32 members.

Advocating for the Violence Against Women Act
1995: Congress passes the Violence Against Women Act, creating programs and greater legal recourse for survivors of domestic abuse. Hadassah, an early advocate on behalf of victims of domestic violence, intensifies its programs on domestic abuse, both in the U.S. and in Israel. The National Committee of Hadassah Associates is formed to encourage men to take a more activist role in its membership enrollment and fundraising activities for the benefit of the Hadassah Medical Organization. Reflecting the world's high hopes for peace in the Middle East, Hadassah honors Prime Minister Rabin and Foreign Minister Peres with the Henrietta Szold Award, presented at the national annual convention held in Jerusalem. Hadassah dedicates its $23 million, state-of-the-art Mother and Child Center at Hadassah-Ein Kerem during the annual National Convention. Comprising the Julia Goldwurm Maternity Pavilion and the Wolfson Children's Pavilion, the center is built with the physical, mental and social well-being of the sick child in mind. It offers the latest care to its patients, in a child friendly atmosphere. The Center is named the Charlotte R. Bloomberg Mother and Child Center in 2003 in honor of New York City Mayor Michael Bloomberg's mother.

1996: Elsie Roth galvanizes her Hadassah Nurses' Council colleagues to spearhead a relief drive for war-torn Bosnia. Hadassah members collect over 100 tons of supplies. Roth and fellow volunteer, Sherry Hahn, personally deliver them to Bosnia's people. Hadassah's National Commission on American Jewish Women publishes Voices for Change: Future Directions for American Jewish Women, a landmark study that directly questions Jewish women about their needs, hopes, and desires. Hadassah initiates grassroots community service with READ*WRITE*NOW!, a U.S. volunteer literacy program. Hadassah transforms its historic 19th-century Villa Rosemarie in Jerusalem's German Colony into Merkaz Hamagshimim, an absorption/community center and residence for young adult olim from English-speaking countries

1997: In honor of Hadassah's 85th Anniversary, Hadassah's first Women of Distinction Awards are presented in Israel (January) and in the U.S. at Purim (March) at Temple Emanu-El, where Hadassah's first meeting was held in 1912. Hadassah joins a broad-based national coalition lobbying for federal legislation to prevent genetic discrimination by health insurance carriers and employers. The Henrietta Szold Hadassah-Hebrew University School of Nursing forms a historic partnership with the University of Maryland School of Nursing to create a clinical master's program at Hadassah. Future projects include graduate programs in trauma/critical care, geriatric nursing and oncology nursing. Young Judaea forms ATID (future, in Hebrew), an educational and action partnership with Israel's Tsofim (Scouts) and Britain's Federation of Zionist Youth (FZY), its sister movement. Impelled by Voices for Change, Hadassah founds the International Research Institute on Jewish Women at Brandeis University, now known as the Hadassah-Brandeis Institute (HBI).

1998: In honor of Israel's 50th Anniversary 1. Hadassah allocates $3 million to make JNF's American Independence Park Israel's first completely handicapped-accessible park. Eight more such Hadassah-funded parks are scheduled for necessary renovation. 2. Hadassah's Jewish Education Department publishes "Zionism: The Sequel", examining the state of the Zionist movement and Israel, its greatest creation. 3. Hadassah sponsors a special Miracle Mission to Israel, led by former National President Ruth Popkin. Youth Aliyah's Meier Shfeyah Children's Village receives the Israel Prize in Education. Hadassah initiates the Hadassah Leadership Academy (HLA), which then pilots its first multi-year program in Jewish women's history, Zionism and Israel, community leadership, and social advocacy. Hadassah's National Board formally establishes the Hadassah Foundation with a $10 million endowment to address societal needs in Israel and the U.S., outside the traditional Hadassah project framework. The Goldyne Savad Institute of Gene Therapy is established at Hadassah-Ein Kerem, enabling HMO to become a leader in genetic therapy and gene research. The Young Judaea Alumni Study, undertaken to gauge the youth movement's long-term impact on participants, reveals that active membership in Young Judaea exerts a powerful positive influence upon adult Jewish identity and increases Jewish involvement. HMO health professionals Professor Dan Engelhardt and Professor Yoel Donchin, activated IDF reservists, bring medical equipment and eight tons of medical supplies to Macedonian field hospitals to assist refugees trom a devastated Kosovo.

1999: At National Convention in Washington, D.C., 2,000 Hadassah delegates from across the United States visit Capitol Hill, bringing Hadassah voices to their senators and representatives - Hadassah's largest "Day on the Hill" ever.

"To Save a Life" program
2000: The Hadassah College of Technology turns 30 and graduates its first academic class. Hadassah introduces Pikuah Nefesh – To Save a Life, a program created to increase awareness of the need for organ and tissue donations. In support of stricter gun control legislation, Hadassah members and friends join the Mother's Day Million Mom March in Washington, D.C. and around the United States. The Al-Aksa Intifada erupts on the Temple Mount on September 28. Violence engulfs the territories and the entire land of Israel. HMO mobilizes to treat the wounded, whild HWZOA provides new programs, speakers, materials and action alerts for its members in the United States. Hadassah partners with Birthright Israel, a philanthropic initiative to foster connections with Israel by giving every Jewish youngster/student between the ages of 18 and 26 a free, first-time trip to Israel; some programs are to be provided through Young Judaea. Hadassah hospitals at Mount Scopus and Ein Kerem are declared smoke-free zones in accordance with Hadassah's mission to protect and promote health.

2001–present

ECOSOC recognition
2001: Hadassah is approved by the U.N. Economic and Social Council (ECOSOC) as a non-governmental organization (NGO), enabling Hadassah to lend its medical and social expertise to the international body. As JNF celebrates its centennial, Hadassah, its partner for 75 years, designates $3 million to help improve Israel's water situation with a new reservoir in the Jordan Valley. The Esther Gottesman Center for Technology, housed within HCT's restored "Arches" building, is dedicated. It includes the new Henrietta Szold Center for students with special needs and challenges

2002: In response to the growing need for state-of-the-art trauma medicine, Hadassah launches a major fundraising program to expand the Center for Emergency Medicine at Hadassah-Ein Kerem.

2004: With many months of recovery and reconstruction work needed to repair the devastation left by Hurricane Charley on the southwest coast of Florida, Hadassah launches a special appeal to raise assistance funds. Researchers at HMO show that human embryonic stem cells can improve the functioning of a laboratory rat with Parkinson's disease. The research team is headed by Prof. Benjamin Reubinoff, director of Hadassah's Center for Human Embryonic Stem Cell research at the Goldyne Savad Institute of Gene Therapy and the Department of Gynecology, and Prof. Tamir Ben-Hur, senior physician in Hadassah's department of Neurology, the Agnes Ginges Center for Human Neurogenetics. The research was funded in part by the National Institute of Neurological Disorders and stroke (NINDS), a component of the National Institute of Health (NIH) in the United States.

2005: Hadassah dedicates its newest facility, the Judy and Sidney Swartz Center for Emergency Medicine at Ein Kerem.  The $50 million center has the capacity to treat 100,000 to 120,000 patients annually, an increase of 41 percent above previous use, and includes an expanded trauma and resuscitation unit, an acute and critical care facility, adult and pediatric emergency units, and an observation unit.

In 2005, the two Jerusalem hospitals of the Hadassah Medical Organization were nominated for the Nobel Peace Prize, citing areas in which they promoted peace:
 Maintaining equal treatment for all regardless of religion, ethnicity and nationality
 Setting an example of cooperation and coexistence by maintaining a mixed staff of people of all faiths
 Initiatives to create bridges for peace, even during periods of active conflict between Israel and one or more of its neighbors

2006: Hadassah staff from the Hadassah-Hebrew University Medical Center in Jerusalem volunteer to travel the 112 miles north to Katyusha-struck Nahariya every weekday during the missile bombardment during the summer. They travel in teams composed of a physician (usually an internist), a child psychiatrist, a clinical psychologist, a social worker and a medical clown, clad in helmets and bullet-proof vests, moving through the town from shelter to shelter, reaching out to Nahariya's traumatized residents.

Henrietta Szold's induction into National Women's Hall of Fame
2007: Henrietta Szold, founder of Hadassah, is inducted into the National Women's Hall of Fame in Seneca Falls, NY, the birthplace of the American women's movement. As Young Judaea's Year Course in Israel celebrates its fiftieth year, a new Year Course track includes travel to and study about four extraordinary communities with deep-rooted connections to the Jewish people – Marranos in Portugal, the Lemba of Southern Africa, Bene Israel and Bnei Menashe communities in India, and the Abayudaya Jews of Uganda. Hadassah receives a 4-star rating from Charity Navigator, an independent charity evaluator, highly regarded in the philanthropic world for its data-driven analysis that rates charitable organizations on their ability to efficiently manage and grow the organization's finances. Inspired by its historical imperative to continue building the medical infrastructure of Jerusalem, Hadassah raises the first $164 million needed to begin construction of the new Sarah Wetsman Davidson Hospital Tower on the campus of Hadassah Hospital in Ein Kerem.

2008: Nancy Falchuk, National President of Hadassah, is part of the Bush Delegation celebrating the 60th Anniversary of the State of Israel. Research at HMO shows that transplantation of human embryonic stem cells into the brains of mice with multiple sclerosis (MS) significantly slows the clinical symptoms and pathological manifestations of the disease.

2012: Hadassah celebrated its centennial in Jerusalem. Hadassah opened the Sarah Wetsman Davidson Hospital Tower, a 500 bed-facility with 20 operating theaters, as well as five below-ground floors for protection from terrorist attacks.

List of National Presidents

Other ventures

Jewish National Fund 
The Jewish National Fund was founded in 1901 by Theodor Herzl to secure ownership of land in Palestine for the Jewish people from the Ottoman Empire. This land, the majority of which was uncultivated, was reclaimed to create collective worker's communities that could sustain themselves through agricultural means. As the Jewish National Fund's funding grew, so did their involvement in other facets of cultural improvement, such as creating major city structures, financing the expenses of Jewish scientists, and founding institutions of higher education. Hadassah's partnership with JNF in the 1920s aided in the continuation of like-minded efforts including meeting an additional JNF pledge to replace 100,000 trees destroyed by arson in 1990, a pledge to provide JNF recreational facilities in a Galilee development plan, and allocating $3 million to make JNF's American Independence Park Israel's first completely handicapped-accessible park, among others. Memorial trees and forests are still purchased in individual's honors and given as gifts for major events.

International programs
Established in 1983 by National President Bernice Tannenbaum, Hadassah International is a network of volunteers, including men and women of many faiths and nationalities. 
Hadassah International does work on every continent save Antarctica.
Young Hadassah International is Hadassah International's branch for 18- to 35-year-olds, active in Germany, Australia, Mexico and the United Kingdom, among others.

Hadassah Magazine

Hadassah Magazine is a bimonthly magazine published out of Hadassah, WZOA's headquarters in Manhattan, covering news, politics and cultural topics, primarily for Jewish female audience. It has been in circulation since 1914, and in 1986 had 385,000 paid subscribers to its printed edition. The magazine gained additional readers in the early 2000s when it added its free online edition, though the move also brought a decline in the printed edition readership. The paid print circulation is now estimated at over 250,000.

Hadassah Magazine received more than 350 awards for editorial excellence, including a National Magazine Award nomination in 1993, and multiple Simon Rockower Awards.

The magazine was a pioneer in the ban on cigarette advertising "in keeping with the mission and philosophy of the organization"

Madoff scandal
Hadassah invested some $40 million with Bernard Madoff Securities, beginning in 1988 with a $7 million gift from a French donor and adding $33 million over the following eight years. The investment initially proved quite profitable: through April 2007, Hadassah withdrew a total of $137 million.

Hadassah's balance of $90 million evaporated in December 2008, when the fund was revealed as a Ponzi scheme. Moreover, because Hadassah had profited from Madoff's scheme, it was targeted for "clawback" efforts by the trustee representing Madoff victims who lost money. After several months of negotiations, Hadassah agreed to contribute $45 million to a fund for Madoff's victims.

After testifying at Madoff's sentencing hearing and urging a long prison sentence for the disgraced financier, Hadassah's Chief Financial Officer, Sheryl Weinstein acknowledged a 20-year long adulterous affair with Madoff, during which period Hadassah had been investing heavily with him.

See also
List of investors in Bernard L. Madoff Securities
Health care in Israel
Economy of Israel
Education in Israel
Hadassah Medical Center

References

External links
Guide to the Hadassah Archives on Long-term Deposit at the American Jewish Historical Society
 Official website
 Hadassah Hospital

 Hadassah International
 Hadassah magazine
 Labor of Thy Hands  a short film produced by Hadassah in the mid-1950s

 
Charities based in New York City
Zionist organizations
Zionism in the United States
1912 establishments in New York City
Women's religious organizations
Jewish magazines published in the United States
General Zionism
Madoff investment scandal
Judaism and women
Jewish organizations
Jewish women's organizations
Abortion-rights organizations